Heilo prospect is an oil exploration area in the Barents Sea off Norway. It is located east of the Goliat field and northwest of the Nucula oil and gas field.

The licence is owned by GDF Suez E&P Norway AS (30%), North Energy ASA (20%), Rocksource (20%), Front Exploration AS (20%), and Repsol Exploration Norway AS (10%). Operator is GDF Suez E&P Norway AS.

Drilling started in September 2011 by using semi-submersible Aker Barents.

References

Oil fields in Norway
Engie
Barents Sea
Natural gas fields in the Arctic Ocean